John Godelee was the Dean of Wells during 1305.

References

Deans of Wells
14th-century English people